Northwood Technical College (formerly known as Wisconsin Indianhead Technical College or WITC) is a public technical college with campuses in Ashland, New Richmond, Rice Lake and Superior, Wisconsin. There are also outreach centers in Balsam Lake, Hayward and Ladysmith and Shell Lake. 

The college offers more than 100 degrees, diplomas and certificates.

References

External links
Official website

Wisconsin technical colleges
Duluth–Superior metropolitan area
Education in Ashland County, Wisconsin
Education in Barron County, Wisconsin
Education in St. Croix County, Wisconsin
Education in Douglas County, Wisconsin
Superior, Wisconsin
Ashland, Wisconsin